The Federal University of Pará (UFPA) is one of the three public universities maintained by the Brazilian federal government in the state of Pará. It was ranked as the 15th largest Brazilian university in a 2011 academic ranking by the number of enrollments. The university has over 60,000 students enrolled in its courses, which are offered across its many campuses in the cities of Belém, Abaetetuba, Altamira, Ananindeua, Bragança, Castanhal, Cametá, Capanema, Breves, Tucuruí and Soure. Among UFPA research teams, there are many nationally recognized groups, particularly in the fields of genetics, parasitology, tropical diseases and geosciences.
The Federal University of Pará is the largest institution in the North region of Brazil by enrollment and is a reference in the areas of Biomedical Sciences and Biology research, this last one mainly because of the Amazon Rainforest.

It was founded in 1957, as a non-profit public higher education institution located in the large city of Belem, Para. The university is officially accredited/recognised by the Brazilian Ministry of Education as a prominent, coeducational higher education institution.

UFPA is a Federal Institution of higher education with didactic, scientific, disciplinary, administrative, financial and property management autonomy. It is a multiple-Campus university with operations in the state of Pará with 12 Campuses, 93 Regional Poles and two University Hospitals, being the most important institution in the Amazon region. UFPA hosts more than 66,000 people distributed as follows: 2,462 faculty members; 5,379 technical and administrative personnel; 58,478 students, most of them enrolled in undergraduate courses (48,910), and  postgraduate courses (9,424). The university offers 340 undergraduate courses, 62 postgraduate lato sensu courses and 124 postgraduate stricto sensu courses, with 84 master’s degree and 40 doctoral degree courses.

The university offers bachelor degrees in the fields of arts and humanities, business and social sciences, language and culture, medicine and health, engineering and science and technology. Postgraduate degrees (master's and doctorate) are offered in all of the above-mentioned areas, except medicine and health and language and culture (doctorate degree).

Among UFPA research teams, there are many nationally recognised groups, particularly in the fields of parasitology, tropical diseases and geosciences. UFPA is considered the greatest university in the North region of Brazil and is a reference in the areas of biomedical sciences and biology research, the latter due to the city’s location as a gateway to the Amazon river and house to the Amazon rainforest.

The University main campus is located in the Pará’s capital city, Belém, a city with a tropical climate. It is very humid and moist, with no dry season. This gives the tropical rainforest vegetation the ideal amount of moisture in which to thrive. The Amazon is home to an astounding variety of species; both plant and animal. This area is known for being home to portions of the Amazon River and its jungle, as well as for its abundant rubber and timber plantations. Some of the most popular attractions include Estacao das Docas (Station of the Docks), Teatro da Paz (Peace Theatre) – dating back as far as 1869 and taking one of the many river tours that are conducted on a regular basis. One can also drop by the Mercado Ver-o-Peso, the largest free fair in South America, as well as the Mangrove of Herons Garden, a contemporary-styled park in the Cidade Velha area of Belém.

Subdivisions 
The following units are part of the university complex:

 Institutes: 15. Art Sciences; Biological Sciences; Education Sciences; Exact and Natural Sciences; Legal Sciences; Health Sciences; Applied Social Sciences; Philosophy and Humanities; Geosciences;  Modern Languages; Technology; Mathematics and Science Education; Coastal Estuaries; Veterinary Medicine; Small Rural Properties.

 Study and Research Centers: 9. Higher Amazonian Studies; Amazon Development in Engineering; Aquatic Ecology and Fisheries in the Amazon; Transdisciplinary Studies in Basic Education; Tropical Medicine; Research in Oncology; Behavioral Theory and Research; Environmental; Agricultural Sciences and Rural Development.
 Campi: 12. Abaetetuba, Altamira, Ananindeua, Belém, Bragança, Breves, Cametá, Capanema, Castanhal, Salinópolis, Soure e Tucuruí.
 Education poles: 93
 School of Music: 1. UFPA School of Music (EMUFPA).
 Theater and Dance School: 1. UFPA Theater and Dance School (ETDUFPA).
 University Hospitals: 2. João de Barros Barreto University Hospital (HUJBB); Bettina Ferro de Souza University Hospital (HUBFS).
 Veterinary Hospital: 1.  Veterinary Hospital of the Federal University of Pará (HV-UFPA).

Rankings

Museum of the Federal University of Pará 

The Museum of the Federal University of Pará (MUFPA) was established in 1983 to house collections of the university from both Brazil and its North Region. It is located in the Augusto Montenegro Mansion, the former residence of Governor Augusto Montenegro.

Notable alumni

— Jean Hébette : Professor Hébbete was an economist and one of the greatest references in research involving Amazon's social conditions.

— Luiz Carlos de Lima Silveira : Luiz Silveira was a pioneer in the development of Neuroscience at UFPa. He is a respected neuroscientist in Brazil and had a Ph.D in Neurophysiology from Oxford University.

— Maria Paula Cruz Schneider : One of the greatest Brazilian's geneticist. Dr. Schneider was a student of the first Biology major of the University. Her research focus mainly in Polymorphism (biology).

See also
 Federal Rural University of Amazonia
Pará State University
Federal Institute of Pará
Universities and Higher Education in Brazil

References

External links

 Official website of the Federal University of Pará

1957 establishments in Brazil
Universities and colleges in Pará
Educational institutions established in 1957
Para